Two ships of the United States Navy have been named Chester, after the city of Chester, Pennsylvania.

 , was a light cruiser in service from 1908 to 1921.
 , was a heavy cruiser commissioned in 1930, in use throughout World War II, and decommissioned in 1946.

United States Navy ship names